Shingo Kunieda defeated Stéphane Houdet in the final, 4–6, 6–1, 7–6(7–3) to win the men's singles wheelchair tennis title at the 2018 Australian Open. It was his ninth Australian Open singles title and 21st major singles title overall, and his first major championship in over two years.

Gustavo Fernández was the defending champion, but was defeated Nicolas Peifer in the quarterfinals in a rematch of the previous year's final.

Seeds

Draw

Draw

References 

General

 Drawsheets on ausopen.com

Specific

Wheelchair Men's Singles
2018 Men's Singles